Qareh Toghan Rural District is a rural district (dehestan) in the Central District of Neka County, Mazandaran Province, Iran. At the 2006 census, its population was 21,747, in 5,667 families. The rural district has 24 villages.

References 

Rural Districts of Mazandaran Province
Neka County